Medan tiden tänker på annat (lit. When the Time Is Thinking About Other Things) is a 1992 novel by Swedish author Niklas Rådström. It won the August Prize in 1992.

References

1992 Swedish novels
Swedish-language novels
August Prize-winning works